The Poor Fork is a  tributary of the Cumberland River in Letcher and Harlan Counties, southeast Kentucky, in the United States. The river flows from its source at Flat Gap in the Appalachian Mountains, on the Kentucky–Virginia border, generally southwest to its confluence about a mile (1.6 km) north of Harlan.

See also
Clover Fork
Martin's Fork
List of rivers of Kentucky

References

Rivers of Kentucky
Rivers of Harlan County, Kentucky
Rivers of Letcher County, Kentucky
Tributaries of the Cumberland River